Night Court is an American sitcom, a revival of the original series of the same title that aired from 1984 to 1992. It premiered on NBC on January 17, 2023. In February 2023, the series was renewed for a second season.

Premise
Judge Abby Stone (Melissa Rauch) comes to New York City to take a job as magistrate for Manhattan Criminal Court's night shift – a position held by her late father Harry Stone.  Also part of the night shift are ambitious prosecutor Olivia (India de Beaufort), insecure clerk Neil (Kapil Talwalkar), cheerful and eccentric bailiff Donna "Gurgs" Gurganous (Lacretta), and public defender Dan Fielding (John Larroquette) – who had served as prosecutor in Harry's court, and was convinced by Abby to join her court when the assigned public defender quit on Abby's first day.

Cast

Main

 Melissa Rauch as Abby Stone, the daughter of the late Harry Stone, who fills her father's former position as judge on the night shift at the Manhattan Criminal Court. In "Blood Moon Binga", it is revealed that her full name is Abracadabra Stone, though she believed it was Abigail, the name she uses.
 India de Beaufort as Olivia, the assistant district attorney assigned to Abby's court
 Kapil Talwalkar as Neil, Abby's clerk
 Lacretta as Donna "Gurgs" Gurganous, the bailiff for Abby's court
 John Larroquette as Dan Fielding, the former assistant district attorney for Harry's court who comes back to serve as the public defender in Abby's court, reprising his role from the original series.

Guest starring
 Wendie Malick as Julianne, Dan's date who reveals herself as a career criminal intent on ruining his life as revenge for prosecuting her years ago
 Faith Ford as Gina, Abby's mother and Harry's widow
 Pete Holmes as Rand, Abby's fiancé

Production

Development
On December 16, 2020, it was announced that Warner Bros. Television Studios and NBC were developing a Night Court sequel series. John Larroquette was slated to reprise his role as Dan Fielding, and produce the show. Melissa Rauch, who initiated the project, and her husband Winston Rauch were to be executive producers, for After January Productions. Dan Rubin would write the series, and be an executive producer as well.

On May 3, 2021, the series was given a pilot order by NBC, and on September 24, 2021, was given a series order. The series premiered on January 17, 2023. On February 2, 2023, NBC renewed the series for a second season.

Casting
Larroquette was already attached to the series when it was announced on December 16, 2020. Although Rauch was not originally expected to act in the show, on April 30, 2021, it was reported that she would play the leading role of Judge Abby Stone, the daughter of the original series character Harry Stone.

In June 2021, Ana Villafañe joined the cast as Monica, an assistant district attorney, and Lacretta was cast as Donna "Gurgs" Gurganous, a court bailiff. In July 2021, Kapil Talwalkar was cast as Neil, a court clerk. 

Villafañe left the series after shooting the original pilot. In March 2022, India de Beaufort was cast as Olivia, a prosecutor, in a "reimagining" of Villafañe's role, as a second pilot episode was then shot.

Episodes

Reception

Critical response
The review aggregator website Rotten Tomatoes reported a 71% approval rating with an average rating of 6.6/10, based on 21 critic reviews. The website's critics consensus reads, "This revival retains enough of the original Night Courts spirit to ward off objections from fans while offering a somewhat stale sitcom format to newcomers, but it ought to sustain interest when judged alongside its own peers." Metacritic, which uses a weighted average, assigned a score of 65 out of 100 based on 12 critics, indicating "generally favorable reviews".

William Hughes of The A.V. Club gave the series a B and said, "If you're curious about it, don't let the pilot throw you off, at least; check back in a few episodes later, once the show has actually hit its (often pretty funny) comedic stride."

Ratings

References

External links
 

2020s American sitcoms
2020s American legal television series
2020s American workplace comedy television series
2023 American television series debuts
American sequel television series
English-language television shows
NBC original programming
Television series by Universal Television
Television series by Warner Bros. Television Studios
Television shows set in Manhattan